The City of London Militia Act 1662 (14 Car 2 c 3) or Militia Act [of] 1662 is an Act of the Parliament of England which codified the power of [lord-]lieutenants of places in England and Wales to raise the militia. In practice, most lieutenancy areas were counties, but the 1662 act made exemptions for the Constable of the Tower and Lord Warden of the Cinque Ports to act as lieutenants within their jurisdictions (the Tower Hamlets and Confederation of Cinque Ports respectively). Most provisions of the 1662 act were implicitly repealed by subsequent Militia Acts, and the whole act was explicitly repealed by the Statute Law Revision Act 1863 except in relation to the City of London, Tower Hamlets, and Cinque Ports. The Territorial Army and Militia Act 1921 repealed the whole act except for section 1 in relation to the Lord Lieutenant of the City of London and section 26 in relation to levying rates for the City of London Militia. The restricted scope of its remaining provisions was reflected in the official short title City of London Militia Act 1662 assigned in 1948. Section 1 was repealed by the Reserve Forces Act 1980, while  section 26 as amended remains in force in England and Wales.

Footnote

References

External links
The City of London Militia Act 1662, as amended, from Legislation.gov.uk.
 

Acts of the Parliament of England
1662 in law
17th century in London
1662 in England
Lord Lieutenancies
United Kingdom military law